S. P. Adithanar Senior Tamil Scholar Award, is presented annually to recognize senior Tamil scholar for their lifetime contribution. It was instituted by Daily Thanthi groups in the memory of S. P. Adithanar, founder of Daily Thanthi. The award is presented on anniversary celebration of S.P. Adithanar every year at Rani Seethai Hall. It is presented in the name of Mootha Thamizharingnar for their literary contribution, which consists of 3 Lakh rupees prize money.

Recipients 
 Erode Thamizhanban 2017
 Dr. Aruko 2016
 Ma. Mu. Sethuraman 2015
 Avvai Natarajan 2014
 Ponneelan 2012
 Cha. Ve. Subramanian 2013
 Kumari Ananthan 2011
 V. C. Kulandaiswamy 2010
 M.R.P. Gurusamy

See also
 S. P. Adithanar Literary Award

References 

Tamil-language literature
Indian literary awards